
Gmina Szczekociny is an urban-rural gmina (administrative district) in Zawiercie County, Silesian Voivodeship, in southern Poland.

Villages
Apart from the town of Szczekociny, Gmina Szczekociny contains the villages and settlements of Bógdał, Bonowice, Brzostek, Chałupki, Drużykowa, Goleniowy, Grabiec, Gustawów, Małachów, Ołudza, Przyłęk, Rędziny, Rokitno, Siedliska, Starzyny, Szyszki, Tęgobórz, Wólka Ołudzka and Wólka Starzyńska.

Neighbouring gminas
Gmina Szczekociny is bordered by the gminas of Irządze, Koniecpol, Kroczyce, Lelów, Moskorzew, Pilica, Radków, Secemin, Słupia and Żarnowiec.

Twin towns – sister cities

Gmina Szczekociny is twinned with:
 Adony, Hungary
 Jelšava, Slovakia

References

Szczekociny
Zawiercie County